Holger Bernhard Bruno Mischwitzky (born Holger Radtke; 25 November 1942), known professionally as Rosa von Praunheim, is a German film director, author, painter and one of the most famous gay rights activists in the German-speaking world. In over 50 years, von Praunheim has made more than 150 films (short and feature-length films). His works influenced the development of LGBTQ+ rights movements worldwide.

He began his career associated to the New German Cinema as a senior member of the Berlin school of underground filmmaking. He took the artistic female name Rosa von Praunheim to remind people of the pink triangle that homosexuals had to wear in Nazi concentration camps, as well as the Frankfurt neighborhood of Praunheim where he grew up. A pioneer of Queer Cinema, von Praunheim has been an activist in the gay rights movement. He was an early advocate of AIDS awareness and safer sex. His films center on gay-related themes and strong female characters, are characterized by excess and employ a campy style. They have featured such personalities as Keith Haring, Larry Kramer, Diamanda Galás, William S. Burroughs, Allen Ginsberg, Judith Malina, Jeff Stryker, Jayne County, Divine and a row of Warhol superstars.

Early life
His biological mother died in 1946 at the psychiatric hospital in Berlin Wittenauer Heilstätten. After his birth, he was given up for adoption. He only found out these facts when his adoptive mother, Gertrud Mischwitzky, told him in 2000. He discovered the fate of his biological mother in 2006 after a lengthy investigation. He documented his quest in the film Two Mothers (2007).

He received the name Holger Mischwitzky and spent his early years in East Berlin. In 1953, he escaped from East Germany with his family to West Germany, first to the Rhineland, moving later to Frankfurt am Main. After von Praunheim left the pre-university high school in Frankfurt (Gymnasium), he studied at the Werkkunstschule in Offenbach. He then transferred to the Berlin University of the Arts where he studied fine arts but did not graduate. He initially worked as a painter, but eventually opted for a career in filmmaking.

Career
In the mid-1960s he assumed the stage name "Rosa von Praunheim". In the late 1960s, he began experimenting in film and creative writing. He made his debut associated with Werner Schroeter with experimental and short movies, like Sisters of the Revolutions (1969) and Samuel Beckett (1969), with which he quickly became famous. His film Macbeth - Opera by Rosa von Praunheim was shown at the world famous art exhibition documenta V. Von Praunheim married the actress Carla Aulaulu in 1969. The marriage ended two years later in divorce. At the beginning of his career, von Praunheim also worked as an assistant director for Gregory J. Markopoulos, who dedicated his film (A)lter (A)ction (1968) to him. Rainer Werner Fassbinder staged the play Dedicated to Rosa von Praunheim (1969) for von Praunheim.

Von Praunheim's first feature film was produced in 1971: The Bed Sausage, a parody of bourgeois marriage. It became a cult movie, which had a sequel in 1975 (Berlin Bed Sausage): "Avant-garde cinema also has its masters, its greatest in Germany: Rosa von Praunheim. His film The Bed Sausage, which premiered on ZDF, confirmed once again what his works Pink Workers on Golden Street and Sisters of the Revolution, which have already been shown at many festivals, characterise: A mixture of artistic inventiveness, social awareness and humour that is exceedingly rare in Germany." (Frankfurter Allgemeine Zeitung)

In 1971 the director also caused a stir with his film It Is Not the Homosexual Who Is Perverse, But the Society in Which He Lives which led to many gay rights groups being founded and was the beginning of the modern lesbian and gay liberation movement in Germany and Switzerland: "Rosa von Praunheim's film made an epoch." (Frankfurter Rundschau) The film also made Rosa von Praunheim the leading figure of the lesbian and gay movement in Germany: "It is a personal liberation for Holger Mischwitzky [Rosa von Praunheim] - and a wake-up call for all homosexual men. […] With this film, Rosa von Praunheim became the icon of the gay and lesbian movement in Germany almost overnight." (Deutsche Welle) The American film critic Joe Hoeffner wrote in an article about the twelve most important queer films: "Many films have been called revolutionary, but It Is Not the Homosexual… truly earns that description. The breakout film by director and activist Rosa von Praunheim (aka Holger Mischwitzky) became a foundational text of the German gay rights movement, and its call for liberation reverberated through the history of queer cinema." This movie found great resonance internationally. Some artists have referred to the film, for example Bruce LaBruce with the short film collection It Is Not the Pornographer That Is Perverse... (2018).

A prolific and controversial filmmaker, von Praunheim has centered his directorial efforts in documentaries featuring gay-related themes. In the early 1970s he lived for some time in the United States where he made a series of documentaries about the post-Stonewall American gay scene. In Army of Lovers or Revolt of the Perverts (1979) he took on the American gay and lesbian movement from the 1950s until the late 1970s. He was also interested in the underground theater in New York City, which was the focus of some of his films of this period including Underground and Emigrants (1976). In 1979 von Praunheim won a German Film Award for Tally Brown, New York, a documentary about the singer and actress Tally Brown. In the USA von Praunheim worked with camera people like Jeff Preiss, Mike Kuchar and Juliana Wang.

Back in Berlin, he made feature films such as Our Corpses Are Still Alive (1981) and Red Love (1982).  In 1983 von Praunheim's revolutionary film City of Lost Souls (1983) with Jayne County and Angie Stardust was released: "This riotous and massively ahead-of-its-time intersectional queer-punk musical has gone on to greatly influence transgender politics." (Australian Centre for the Moving Image) These films were shown at film festivals worldwide. His feature film Horror Vacui won the Los Angeles Film Critics Association Award for best experimental film in 1985. Anita: Dances of Vice (1987), the life story of a scandalous nude dancer in Berlin in the 1920s, attracted international attention. The film was shown, for example, at the New York Film Festival and the Chicago International Film Festival.

With the outbreak of the AIDS epidemic, von Praunheim worked on films about the HIV-related disease. A Virus Knows No Morals (1986) was one of the first feature films about AIDS internationally: "A Virus Respects No Morals, a savage, imaginative, scattershot Brecht-like allegory set largely in a gay bath, became one of the earliest and most provocative attacks on the hypocrisy, ignorance, politics and economics surrounding the AIDS crisis." (Los Angeles Times)
The documentaries Positive and Silence = Death, both shot in 1989, deal with aspects of AIDS activism in New York. Fire Under Your Ass (1990) focuses on AIDS in Berlin. For the so-called AIDS trilogy, von Praunheim was awarded the LGBTIQ-Film-Prize of the Berlin International Film Festival. The Guardian, one of Britain's most important newspapers, wrote in 1992: "Silence = Death and Positive: The best AIDS films to date [...]." The Los Angeles Times summed it up: "In short, Praunheim is just the man for the job he has taken on with Silence = Death and Positive: he has the breadth of vision, the compassion and the militance and, yes, the sense of humor necessary to tackle the AIDS epidemic in all its aspects." The renowned critic Jerry Tallmer, founder of the Obie Award, wrote in the newspaper The Record: "[...] Rosa (originally Holger) von Praunheim, the brilliant, acerbic director of such breakthrough gay-revolutionist works as Silence & Death and A Virus Knows No Morals."

Von Praunheim was a co-founder of the German ACT UP movement and organized the first major AIDS benefit event in Germany. He was very vocal in his efforts to educate people about the danger of AIDS and the necessity of practicing safer sex. On 10 December 1991, von Praunheim created a scandal in Germany when he outed the anchorman Alfred Biolek and the comedian Hape Kerkeling in the TV show  as gay to call for public solidarity with the stigmatized gays from homosexual celebrities, of which there were hardly any in the German public at that time. Because of this, von Praunheim was considered a controversial figure in his home country for a long time, even within the queer community. But after the public outing action several celebrities had their coming out. In retrospect, the outing action improved the public image of gays.

In the early 1990s, von Praunheim developed the first queer TV format in Germany, but continued his film work at the same time. His film Life Is Like a Cucumber with Lotti Huber was shown at the Toronto International Film Festival (1991). He was honored with two FIPRESCI Awards for his films I Am My Own Woman (1992) and Neurosia (1995).

Von Praunheim's film Transexual Menace (1996), named after the American transgender rights organization The Transexual Menace, was after City of Lost Souls again a very progressive film about transgender people and premiered at the Frameline Film Festival in San Francisco and was also shown at the Outfest in Los Angeles: "Von Praunheim's Transexual Menace dispenses with the usual cliches and brings us bang up to date with a profile of the new generation of politically-active transsexuals […]." (The Independent) The New York Times wrote: "[...] Transexual Menace is a cornerstone of documentary filmmaking about transgender people."

Von Praunheim's film The Einstein of Sex (1999) about Magnus Hirschfeld premiered at the Locarno Festival and was nominated for the Golden Leopard. His film Can I be your Bratwurst, please? (1999) with Jeff Stryker and Vaginal Davis has been shown at over 250 film festivals around the world (a world record-breaking festival utilization). Moving Pictures Magazine chose the film as best title in Cannes. His film Cows knocked up by fog (2002) premiered at the Venice Film Festival.

From 1999 to 2006 von Praunheim was professor of directing at the Film University of Babelsberg. Von Praunheim has also taught at various film and art schools, including San Francisco Art Institute, where Abel Ferrara was one of his students. Former Praunheim students,  filmmakers Tom Tykwer, Chris Kraus, Axel Ranisch, Robert Thalheim and Julia von Heinz, made the film Pink Children (2012) about their mentor.

In 2008, his film Two Mothers was shown at Tribeca Film Festival and was nominated for the Jury-Award.
At the 63rd Berlin International Film Festival, he was awarded the Berlinale Camera as one of the most important representatives of German cinema. Von Praunheim also received the Berlinale Special Teddy Award for his outstanding contributions to queer cinema. In 2012, he was awarded the Grimme-Preis for his documentary Rent Boys. In 2015, he received the Order of Merit of the Federal Republic of Germany. In 2020, he was awarded the Max Ophüls Honorary Award for his life's work. Von Praunheim also received the Honorary Award of the Swiss Pink Apple Film Festival.

On occasion of his 70th birthday (2012), von Praunheim made 70 short and medium-length films for German regional television station RBB under the title Rosa's World. Never before has a documentary filmmaker received so much airtime on German television. Rosa's World has also been shown at film festivals, for example in Vienna (Austria).

Von Praunheim has written several books that have been successfully published by publishing houses such as Rowohlt Verlag.

Von Praunheim has been painting since his early youth and occasionally exhibits in galleries and museums, for example in the Migros Museum of Contemporary Art. He curated exhibitions himself, for example in the Lincoln Center, and was director of the film and video arts department at the Academy of Arts (2015 - 2018).

Rosa von Praunheim had many large and well-regarded film screenings and premieres in the USA, for example at the Museum of Modern Art in New York City (more than 15 times), at The Andy Warhol Museum in Pittsburgh, in the Wheeler Hall of the University of California, Berkeley and at film festivals across the country. For example, he won the Creative Vision Award of the Rhode Island International Film Festival. The American Cinematheque in Hollywood honored von Praunheim with a retrospective in 1997 as "a fearless international pioneer of gay cinema". In 1986, the first edition of the Gay Cinema Festival in Toronto held a Rosa von Praunheim retrospective to honor the director as "the dean of Berlin's underground filmmakers". In Canada, his films were also shown at the Montreal World Film Festival, among other places. Several of the director's films premiered in Great Britain at the Edinburgh International Film Festival and in Australia at the Sydney Film Festival. The Tate Modern in London also showed Rosa von Praunheim's films. Mardi Gras Film Festival Sydney honored von Praunheim in a film series about the most important queer filmmakers.

Queer film festival Ciclo Rosa (Zyklos Rosa) in Bogotá was named in honor of Rosa von Praunheim. In South America, von Praunheim's films were shown at the Buenos Aires International Festival of Independent Cinema and São Paulo International Film Festival, among other places. In Asia, for example, at the Shanghai International Film Festival, the Hong Kong International Film Festival, the Taipei Film Festival and the Tokyo International Lesbian & Gay Film Festival. Von Praunheim was represented at many A film festivals worldwide, often several times. He had more than 20 films at the Berlin International Film Festival, making him record holder there, and had numerous retrospectives in many countries.

His films are also evaluated in an academic context and shown at universities, for example at Beaux-Arts de Paris, The Courtauld Institute of Art London, University of Pennsylvania, Columbia University in New York City and Harvard University in Cambridge.

Von Praunheim's work has found its way into various academic papers and publications, including from Stanford University and Oxford University.

His film Survival in New York (1989) became von Praunheim's most commercially successful film in Germany, which was followed 20 years later by the sequel New York Memories (2009).

He is also successful as a theater director, winning the Jury-Award at the Theater Authors Days (2018) at the Deutsches Theater Berlin for his play Hitler's Goat and the King's Haemorrhoids.

The magazine The Advocate selected von Praunheim among the world's 50 most important queer people in the fields of activism, art and culture. On the occasion of von Praunheim's 75th birthday (2017), President of Germany Frank-Walter Steinmeier thanked him publicly for his artistic work and social commitment: "My congratulations go to an exceptional artist who, with his extensive cinematic oeuvre, has succeeded in intervening in social reality and changing it [...]." Von Praunheim has received numerous awards for his films and queer political work.

Personal life
Von Praunheim lives in Berlin with his husband , a German author, director and activist for Mental Health.

Books (selection) 
 Männer, Rauschgift und der Tod. 1967
 Oh Muvie. 1968, Fotoroman mit Elfie Mikesch
 Sex und Karriere. Rowohlt TB-V., 1978, 
 Armee der Liebenden oder Aufstand der Perversen. 1979, 
 Gibt es Sex nach dem Tode. Prometh Verlag, 1981, 
 Rote "Liebe": ein Gespräch mit Helga Goetze. Prometh Verl., 1982, 
 50 Jahre pervers. Die sentimentalen Memoiren des Rosa von Praunheim. Verlag Kiepenheuer & Witsch, 1993, 
 Folge dem Fieber und tanze: Briefwechsel mit Mario Wirz. Aufbau-Verlag, 1995
 Mein Armloch. Martin Schmitz Verlag, 2002, Gedichte
 Die Rache der alten dicken Tunte. 2006, Fotobuch
 Die Bettwurst und meine Tante Lucy. 2006, Fotobuch

Selected filmography

 1969: Sisters of the Revolution
 1971: The Bed Sausage
 1971: It Is Not the Homosexual Who Is Perverse, But the Society in Which He Lives
 1974: Axel von Auersperg
 1975: Berlin Bed Sausage
 1979: Tally Brown, New York
 1979: Army of Lovers or Revolt of the Perverts
 1981: Unsere Leichen leben noch
 1982: Red Love
 1983: City of Lost Souls
 1984: Horror Vacui
 1986: A Virus Knows no Morals
 1987: Anita: Dances of Vice
 1987: Dolly, Lotte and Maria
 1989: Survival in New York
 1990: Positive
 1990: Silence = Death (film)
 1990: Life Is Like a Cucumber
 1992: I Am My Own Woman
 1995: Neurosia: 50 Years of Perversity
 1996: Transexual Menace
 1999: The Einstein of Sex
 1999: Can I Be Your Bratwurst, Please?
 1999: Wunderbares Wrodow
 2000: Fassbinder's Women
 2001: Tunten lügen nicht
 2002: Kühe vom Nebel geschwängert
 2002: Pfui Rosa!
 2002: Queens Don't Lie
 2005: Men, Heroes and Gay Nazis
 2005: Your Heart in My Head
 2007: Two Mothers
 2008: The Pink Giant
 2009: History of Hell
 2010: New York Memories
 2011: Rent Boys
 2012: King of Comics
 2012: Rosa's World
 2014: Praunheim Memoires
 2014: How I Learned to Love the Numbers (as producer)
 2015: Tough Love
 2016: Welcome All Sexes - 30 Years Teddy Awards
 2017: ACT! Who am I?
 2017: Survival in Neukölln
 2018: Friendship of Men
 2019: Darkroom - Drops of Death
 2022: Rex Gildo - The Last Dance

Notes

References
Kuzniar, Alice. The Queer German Cinema, Stanford University Press, 2000, 
Murray, Raymond. Images in the Dark: An Encyclopedia of Gay and Lesbian Film and Video. TLA Publications, 1994, 
Zielinski, Ger. Rebel with a Cause: An Interview with Rosa Von Praunheim. Cinéaste, vol. 37, no. 3, 2012.

External links

 
  (in German and English)
 Rosa von Praunheim in the Video Data Bank

Film people from Riga
Baltic-German people
Film directors from Frankfurt
German autobiographers
German LGBT rights activists
Members of the Academy of Arts, Berlin
LGBT film directors
German gay artists
1942 births
Living people
Recipients of the Cross of the Order of Merit of the Federal Republic of Germany
German adoptees
German LGBT screenwriters
German gay writers